The 1863 Heathcote by-election was a by-election held on 28 October in the  electorate during the 3rd New Zealand Parliament.

The by-election was caused by the resignation of the incumbent, William Sefton Moorhouse.

He was replaced by Alfred Cox.

As Cox was the only candidate, he was declared elected unopposed.

References

Heathcote 1863
1863 elections in New Zealand
October 1863 events
Politics of Christchurch